The Flag of Orkney was the winner of a public flag consultation in February and March 2007. In the flag consultation the people of Orkney were asked for their preferred design from a short list of 5, all of which had been approved by the Court of the Lord Lyon. The chosen design was that of Duncan Tullock of Birsay, which polled 53% of the 200 votes cast by the public.

The colours red and yellow are from the Scottish and Norwegian royal coats of arms, which both use yellow and red, with a lion rampant. The flag symbolises the islands' Scottish and Norwegian heritage. The blue is taken from the flag of Scotland and also represents the sea and the maritime heritage of the islands.

Former flag of Orkney
The former flag of Orkney was adopted in 1995. In 2001, the flag of Orkney, the traditional flag of St Magnus, was declined official recognition by the Lord Lyon, the heraldic authority of Scotland, due to similarity with other national flags; as well as the flag of the Kalmar Union.

Chronology

See also
Flag of Shetland
Nordic Cross Flag
Royal Standard of Scotland
Royal Standard of Norway
Flag of Norway
List of Scottish flags
Emblems of the Kalmar Union

References

Flags adopted through competition
Orkney
Flags of places in Scotland
Nordic Cross flags
Orkney